WASP-19b is an extrasolar planet, notable for possessing one of the shortest orbital periods of any known planetary body:  days or approximately 18.932 hours.
It has a mass close to that of Jupiter (1.15 Jupiter masses), but by comparison has a much larger radius (1.31 times that of Jupiter, or 0.13 Solar radii); making it nearly the size of a low-mass star. It orbits the star WASP-19 in the Vela constellation. At the time of discovery it was the shortest period hot Jupiter discovered as planets with shorter orbital periods had a rocky, or metallic composition.

A study in 2012, utilizing the Rossiter–McLaughlin effect, determined the planetary orbit is well aligned with the equatorial plane of the star, misalignment equal to -15°.

In 2013, secondary eclipse and orbital phases were barely observed from the data gathered with ASTEP telescope, making it the first detection of such kind through ground-based observations. This was possible due to the large size of the planet and its small semi-major axis.

In 2019 the planet was observed with TESS and the eclipse of the planet was measured. The broad variations caused by the changing aspect of the heated face of the planet were measured. The study deduced that the dayside has a temperature of 2240 ± 40 K (1967 ± 40 °C) and that the planet reflects 16 ± 4 percent of the light that falls on it.The last value is relatively high compared to other planets.

Despite the short orbital period, orbital decay of WASP-19b was not detected as of 2019.

In August 2022, this planet and its host star were included among 20 systems to be named by the third NameExoWorlds project.

Atmosphere
In December 2013, scientists working with the Hubble Space Telescope reported detecting water in the atmosphere of the exoplanet.

In September 2017, astronomers using the Very Large Telescope at the European Southern Observatory reported the detection of titanium oxide (TiO) in WASP-19b's atmosphere. This was the first time titanium oxide had been detected in an exoplanet atmosphere. They also detected a strongly scattering haze in the atmosphere as well as the element sodium, and additionally confirmed the presence of water. Strong haze and barely discernible titanium oxide signal were confirmed in 2021, while no sign of water or alkali metals can be found.

A study using TESS data concluded that the atmosphere of WASP-19b is moderately efficient at transporting heat from the dayside to the nightside.

References

External links

Exoplanets discovered by WASP
Exoplanets discovered in 2009
Giant planets
Hot Jupiters
Transiting exoplanets
Vela (constellation)